17th CDG Awards
February 17, 2015

Contemporary: 
Birdman or (The Unexpected Virtue of Ignorance)

Fantasy: 
Into the Woods

Period: 
The Grand Budapest Hotel
The 17th Costume Designers Guild Awards, honouring the best costume designs in film and television for 2014, were given in 2015. The nominees were announced on January 8, 2015.

Winners and nominees

Film

Contemporary
 Winner - Birdman or (The Unexpected Virtue of Ignorance) - Albert Wolsky
 Boyhood - Kari Perkins
 Gone Girl - Trish Summerville
 Interstellar - Mary Zophres
 Wild - Melissa Bruning

Fantasy Film
 Winner - Into the Woods - Colleen Atwood
 Guardians of the Galaxy - Alexandra Byrne
 The Hobbit: The Battle of the Five Armies - Bob Buck, Lesley Burkes-Harding, Ann Maskrey
 The Hunger Games: Mockingjay – Part 1 - Kurt Swanson and Bart Mueller
 Maleficent - Anna B. Sheppard, Jane Clive

Period Film
 Winner - The Grand Budapest Hotel - Milena Canonero
 The Imitation Game - Sammy Sheldon Differ
 Inherent Vice - Mark Bridges
 Selma - Ruth E. Carter
 The Theory of Everything - Steven Noble

Television

Contemporary Series
 Winner - True Detective - Jenny Eagan
 House of Cards - Johanna Argan
 Ray Donovan - Christopher Lawrence
 Saturday Night Live - Tom Broecker, Eric Justian
 Scandal - Lyn Paolo

Period or Fantasy Series
 Winner - Game of Thrones - Michele Clapton
 Boardwalk Empire - John Dunn
 The Knick - Ellen Mirojnick
 Mad Men - Jane Bryant
 Masters of Sex - Ane Crabtree

Miniseries or TV Film
 Winner - American Horror Story: Freak Show - Lou Eyrich
 Houdini - Birgit Hutter
 The Normal Heart - Daniel Orlandi
 Olive Kitteridge - Jenny Eagan
 Sherlock - Sarah Arthur

References 

Costume Designers Guild Awards
2014 film awards
2014 television awards
2014 guild awards
2014 in fashion
2015 in American cinema
2015 in American television